Viva! Suburbs! Live at First Avenue is a live album by the American New wave band The Suburbs that was recorded "mostly" on April 24, 1993 at First Avenue, a music venue in Minneapolis, Minnesota. Viva! Suburbs! Live at First Avenue was released by Twin/Tone in 1994.

Track listing 
 "Waiting"
 "Rattle My Bones"
 "DD 69"
 "Idiot Voodoo"
 "Cig Machine"
 "Goggles On"
 "Tape Your Wife to the Ceiling"
 "Life is Like"
 "Every Night's A Friday Night in Hell"
 "Spring Came"
 "Urban Guerillas"
 "Music for Boys"
 "Drinkin' with an Angel"
 "It's Alright"
 "Cows"
 "Black Leather Stick"
 "Love Is the Law"
 "Girlfriend"
 "Underwater Lovers"
 "Even Stars Fade"

Personnel
 Bruce C. Allen – guitar, banshee vocals
 Beej Chaney – vocals, Beejtar
 Michael Halliday – bass
 Hugo Klaers – drums
 Chan Poling – keyboards, vocals

Additional personnel
 Kevin Nord – trumpet
 Laurie Glaser –trumpet
 Max Ray – sax
 Rochelle Becker – baritone sax
 Kurt Nelson – guitar on "Drinkin' with an Angel"

Production notes
 John "Strawberry" Fields – engineer
 Del Monte Lee Wilkes-Booth – live mix
 Chan Poling – mixing
 Hugo Klaers – mixing
 Wallace Fleming – mixing on "It's Alright" and "Even Stars Fade"
 Bruce C. Allen – art direction
 Jay Smiley – cover photo
 Steve Peck – photography
 Rip Nordhaugan – photography
 Stan Crocker – concert lighting

References

External links 
Twin/Tone Records: The Suburbs

1994 live albums
The Suburbs albums
Twin/Tone Records albums